Robert William Malloy (born November 24, 1964) is a former professional baseball pitcher. He played two seasons in Major League Baseball for the Texas Rangers and Montreal Expos.

Malloy attended Gar-Field High School in Woodbridge, Virginia, and later the University of Virginia. Malloy was drafted in the 19th round of the 1986 MLB Draft (475th overall) following his junior year at UVA. After quick success in the Rangers' minor league system, Malloy was called up to the Majors and started two games in 1987. He also pitched two scoreless innings in relief for the Montreal Expos in 1990.

References

1964 births
Living people
American expatriate baseball players in Canada
Baseball players from Virginia
Gastonia Rangers players
Indianapolis Indians players
Jacksonville Expos players
Major League Baseball pitchers
Montreal Expos players
Charlotte Rangers players
Sportspeople from Arlington County, Virginia
Texas Rangers players
Tulsa Drillers players
Virginia Cavaliers baseball players